Timothy J. Ackert (born 13 April 1963) is an American Republican from Connecticut. Since 2011, he has been a member of the Connecticut House of Representatives for the 8th district.

References

External links 
 Twitter

1963 births
Living people
21st-century American politicians
Republican Party members of the Connecticut House of Representatives